Kharatas  is a mountain range in the Kuznetsk Alatau in the western part of the Ust-Abakansky district of the Republic of Khakassia.

The name is derived from the common Turkic kara (black) and Shor tas (naked).

The second order short mountain range   adjoins the main ridge spurs of Kuznetsk Alatau. Kharatas branches off from the main ridge of the Kuznetsk Alatau in the region of Mount Verkhny Zub   and is the watershed of the Kharatas and Bely Iyus rivers. The southern section is represented by peneplanated dissected highlands – dominated by tundra landscapes and fragments of subalpine meadows and light forests on tundra peaty and mountain meadow soils. The middle section – is a steeply sloping middle mountain, deeply dissected, with dark coniferous forests. The northern part – is a steeply sloping, strongly and moderately dissected, ridged, peneplainized lowland, with cedar-fir-spruce and pine-larch forests on the slopes. Kurums of the Kuznetsk Alatau cover the  Karatas ridges.

Popular destination for mountaineering, rock climbing, mountain tourism

Peaks

Passes

Lakes

See also 

 Kuznetsk Alatau
 Kuznetsk Alatau Nature Reserve
 Podnebesnyye Zub'ya
 Ridge Tigirtish

Literature 

 Encyclopedia of the Republic of Khakassia: [in 2 volumes] / Government of the Rep. Khakassia; [scientific-ed. council: V. A. Kuzmin (prev.) and others]. - Abakan: Polikor, 2007. Vol. 1: [A - H]. - 2007. - 430, [2] p. : ill., portr. — Bibliographer. at the end of words. Art. - S. 252–253.

References

Mountain ranges
Mountain ranges of Russia
Landforms of Siberia
Landforms of Khakassia
South Siberian Mountains